Gem is a city in Thomas County, Kansas, United States.  As of the 2020 census, the population of the city was 98.

History
Gem was a shipping point on the Chicago, Rock Island and Pacific Railroad. The town was named from the Gem Ranch.

The first post office in Gem was established in 1885. It was closed in March 2014.

Geography
Gem is located at  (39.425730, -100.896294).

Demographics

2010 census
As of the census of 2010, there were 88 people, 36 households, and 26 families residing in the city. The racial makeup of the city was 100.0% White.

There were 36 households, of which 33.3% had children under the age of 18 living with them, 58.3% were married couples living together, 5.6% had a female householder with no husband present, 8.3% had a male householder with no wife present, and 27.8% were non-families. 25.0% of all households were made up of individuals, and 5.6% had someone living alone who was 65 years of age or older. The average household size was 2.44 and the average family size was 2.92.

The median age in the city was 37 years. 27.3% of residents were under the age of 18; 1.1% were between the ages of 18 and 24; 31.8% were from 25 to 44; 28.3% were from 45 to 64; and 11.4% were 65 years of age or older. The gender makeup of the city was 52.3% male and 47.7% female.

2000 census
As of the census of 2000, there were 96 people, 39 households, and 24 families residing in the city. The racial makeup of the city was 98.96% White, and 1.04% from two or more races. Hispanic or Latino of any race were 1.04% of the population.

There were 39 households, out of which 30.8% had children under the age of 18 living with them, 53.8% were married couples living together, 5.1% had a female householder with no husband present, and 35.9% were non-families. 33.3% of all households were made up of individuals, and 5.1% had someone living alone who was 65 years of age or older. The average household size was 2.46 and the average family size was 3.24.

In the city, the population was spread out, with 29.2% under the age of 18, 13.5% from 18 to 24, 25.0% from 25 to 44, 26.0% from 45 to 64, and 6.3% who were 65 years of age or older. The median age was 34 years. For every 100 females, there were 128.6 males. For every 100 females age 18 and over, there were 134.5 males.

The median income for a household in the city was $38,500, and the median income for a family was $45,417. Males had a median income of $26,875 versus $21,875 for females. The per capita income for the city was $16,805. There were no families and 8.1% of the population living below the poverty line, including no under eighteens and none of those over 64.

Cemetery
The Gem Cemetery is on the west side of the city. Situated in the middle of the cemetery is a fenced-in area containing the headstones of the once-prominent Houston family.  This family was rich in past years, when Gem was larger than it is now, but even their house has since been removed from the city.

Education
The community is served by Colby USD 315 public school district.

References

Further reading

External links
 Gem - Directory of Public Officials
 Gem city map, KDOT

Cities in Kansas
Cities in Thomas County, Kansas